Lee Chin Chen is a Malaysian politician who is the Deputy Speaker of the Pahang State Legislative Assembly. He has served as a Member of the Pahang State Legislative Assembly (MLA) for Bilut since 2018, and previously as the MLA for Ketari. Lee made history as the first non-Malay to serve as Deputy Speaker of the Pahang State Legislative Assembly. A member of the Democratic Action Party in the Pakatan Harapan coalition, Lee was elected Deputy Speaker after Pakatan Harapan and Barisan Nasional allied to form a coalition government when the 2022 Pahang state election resulted in a hung assembly with no single coalition holding an overall majority.

In February 2023, a photo of Lee committing a traffic offence went viral on social media. The photo showed Lee's car violating a "No Entry" sign. Lee issued a statement that he was cooperating with the police investigation, and had received a summons which he would pay. The Bentong district police chief issued a statement confirming that a summons had been issued under Section 79(2) of the Road Transport Act (RTD) 1987.

References 

Living people
Malaysian politicians of Chinese descent
Democratic Action Party (Malaysia) politicians
Members of the Pahang State Legislative Assembly
21st-century Malaysian politicians
Year of birth missing (living people)